Črni Potok pri Velikih Laščah is a small settlement in the hills south of Velike Lašče in southern Slovenia. It lies in the Municipality of Ribnica. The entire municipality is part of the traditional region of Lower Carniola and is now included in the Southeast Slovenia Statistical Region.

Name
The name of the settlement was changed from Črni Potok to Črni Potok pri Velikih Laščah in 1953. In the past the German name was Schwarzenbach.

References

External links

Črni Potok pri Velikih Laščah on Geopedia

Populated places in the Municipality of Ribnica